Stacey Godfrey Evans (born May 5, 1978) is an American politician and Georgia State Representative for District 57 starting in 2021. She received 56.8% of the primary vote, and was uncontested in the general election. A member of the Democratic Party, she was the Georgia State Representative for District 42 from 2011 to 2014. She was succeeded by Teri Anulewicz.

Evans was reelected three times in District 42, most recently receiving 73.25% of the vote in 2016. She resigned her legislative seat to focus on her bid for the 2018 Georgia gubernatorial election; she finished second in the Democratic primary. In addition to serving in the legislature, Evans also founded her own law firm, S.G. Evans Law, LLC.

Georgia General Assembly, 2011–2017

Evans has received numerous awards for her legislative advocacy, including two Arnie awards, the "Super Woman Award" in 2012; and the "Teach Your Children and Colleagues Award" in 2013.

Representative Evans opposed the 20-week abortion ban during the 2012 legislative session. She was 9 months pregnant during the vote, which was scheduled for the day she was to be induced into labor. She spoke out against the bill in a video statement played on the House floor hours before she gave birth. This was one of the first times that a video statement was allowed on the Georgia House floor.

She served on the Judiciary Committee in the Georgia House. In 2015, Evans helped stop Josh McKoon's religious liberty bill from becoming law. She fought to include civil rights protections in the bill and then joined with the majority of her colleagues on the House Judiciary committee in voting to table the legislation. She was commended for her work by Georgia Equality.

Work on HOPE Scholarship

In the legislature, she quickly became known as a fighter for HOPE. She opposed the changes pushed by Governor Nathan Deal and Georgia legislative leaders that, Evans claimed, would push many Georgians off of the scholarship and out of school.

The HOPE Scholarship program began by promising that all those who graduated from Georgia high schools with a B average would be able to go to college with the cost paid for by taxpayers.

Despite the opposition of Evans, a proposal was made to limit the full scholarship only to those who achieved a 3.7 GPA and 1200 on the SAT. Evans responded by claiming that this would prevent many of the students who most needed the help from attending college at all and said in remarks to the House chamber that had these limitations been in place when she graduated from college she wouldn't be standing there that day. 

In the end, the proposal to limit the scholarship was successful.

2018 Georgia gubernatorial race

Representative Evans ran for governor of Georgia in the 2018 Democratic primary election. She lost  in the primary election to former state representative and House Minority Leader Stacey Abrams.

References

External links
 
 
 Legislative page

Democratic Party members of the Georgia House of Representatives
Living people
People from Ringgold, Georgia
21st-century American politicians
Women state legislators in Georgia (U.S. state)
21st-century American women politicians
American women lawyers
American lawyers
University of Georgia alumni
1978 births